Akyayla is a village in the Tillo District of Siirt Province in Turkey. The village is populated by Kurds of the Botikan tribe and had a population of 670 in 2021.

The hamlet of Kargacık is attached to Akyayla.

References 

Kurdish settlements in Siirt Province
Villages in Tillo District